Gustavo Esteva (August 20, 1936, in Mexico City – March 17, 2022, in Oaxaca was a Mexican activist, "deprofessionalized intellectual" and founder of the Universidad de la Tierra in the Mexican city of Oaxaca. He was one of the best-known advocates of post-development.

Life
Esteva's life—as he tells it himself—has been marked by many ruptures; there are also many facts to confirm this view. Esteva has worked in very different environments.

Esteva's father died early.

Esteva worked for different companies. "Despite the personal discomfort brought about by an increasing awareness of the fraud of the original promise of my profession, I advanced rapidly in my career." Finally he turned to the public sector. He worked for the Bank of foreign trade and joined a marxist group with revolutionary aspirations which he quit in 1965.

From 1970 to 1976 he was a high-ranking official in the government of President Echeverría.

When he gave up this job, he was totally  disillusioned about statist development practices.

In 1983 he met Ivan Illich. "[...]  I was invited to a Seminar in Mexico City on the social construction of energy with Wolfgang Sachs. Ivan was there. I was mesmerized. That very night, I embarked on my Illich studium. A little later, I started to collaborate with him. Still later, slowly, we became friends."

He was an advisor with the Zapatista Army for National Liberation in Chiapas for the negotiations with the government. He worked at the Centre for Intercultural Dialogues and Exchanges (CEDI) in the city of Oaxaca, publishes regularly in different journals, and works with Indian groups and NGOs.

Thinking
Esteva had a Catholic upbringing. When he lost his faith in God he replaced it with a faith in reason. Through his studies he became familiar with instrumental rationality; dissatisfied he turned, after some soul searching, to Marxism. During the 70s Esteva

With Marxism, Esteva has given up all ideas about a vanguard.  He is an advocate of radical pluralism.

Discussing the national identity Esteva refers to Guillermo Bonfil' distinction between a profound (México profundo) and  an imaginary Mexico (México imaginario). He questions the modern obsession with planning the future and "projects" of all kinds:

The contrasting attitude of the indigenous peoples, according to Esteva, is not to reject change, but

Traditionally the indigenous people did not oppose their own project to the dominant project -- but times have changed:

Selected works 
Books
David Barkin, Gustavo Esteva: Inflación y Democracia : El Caso de México, México : Siglo XXI, 1979
Gustavo Esteva: Economía y enajenación [Economy and alienation], México, D.F. : Biblioteca Universidad Veracruzana, 1980
Gustavo Esteva: La batalla en el México rural, México : Siglo XXI, 1982.
James E. Austin and Gustavo Esteva (ed.):Food policy en Mexico : the search for selfsufficiency, Ithaca ; London : Cornell Univ. Pr., 1987
Gustavo Esteva: Fiesta - jenseits von Entwicklung, Hilfe und Politik, Frankfurt a. M. : Brandes & Apsel, 1992 -German translation of a selection of essays, enlarged second edition in 1995
Gustavo Esteva: Crónica del fin de una era : el secreto del EZLN, México : Ed. Posada, 1994
Gustavo Esteva Figueroa and Madhu Suri Prakash: Hope at the margins : beyond human rights and development, 	New York : St. Martin’s Press, 1997
Madhu Suri Prakash and Gustavo Esteva: Escaping education : living as learning within grassroots cultures, New York [etc.]: Peter Lang, 1998
 Gustavo Esteva and Madhu Suri Prakash: Grassroots post-modernism : remaking the soil of cultures, London & New Jersey: Zed Books, 1998
Gustavo Esteva, and  Catherine Marielle (eds.):Sin maíz no hay país: páginas de una exposición, México : Consejo Nacional para la Cultura y las Artes, Dirección General de Culturas Populares e Indígenas, 2003
 Gustavo Esteva, Salvatore Babones, and Philipp Babcicky: The future of development : a radical manifesto, Bristol: Policy Press, 2013
 Gustavo Esteva, a cura di, Ripensare il mondo con Ivan Illich, Riola (Bo), Mutus Liber, 2014
 Gustavo Esteva, Nuovi ambiti di comunità Per una riflessione sui ‘beni comuni’, Collana Voci da Abya Yala, Documenti dall'America latina, a cura del gruppo Camminardomandando, Edizioni Mutus Liber, 2016
 Gustavo Esteva, Gustavo Esteva: A Critique of Development and Other Essays, Routledge, 2022

Articles
   Esteva, Gustavo: "Regenerating People's space" in: Saul H. Mendlovitz and R.B.J. Walker, Towards a Just World Peace. London: Butterworths, 1987; pp. 271–298.
 Esteva, Gustavo: "Tepito: No Thanks, First World", in: In Context, num. 30, Fall/Winter 1991
 Esteva, Gustavo: "Development" in The Development Dictionary. A Guide to Knowledge as Power, London & New Jersey: Zed Books, 1992, pp. 6–25
 Esteva, Gustavo: "Re-embedding Food in Agriculture", in: Culture and Agriculture [Virginia, USA], 48, Winter 1994
 Esteva, Gustavo: "From 'Global Thinking' to 'Local Thinking': Reasons to Go beyond Globalization towards Localization", with M.S.Prakash, in: Osterreichische Zeitschirift für Politikwissenschatft, 2, 1995
 Esteva, Gustavo:"Hosting the Otherness of the Green Revolution" in: Frédérique Apffel-Marglin and Stephen A. Marglin, eds.: Decolonizing Knowledge: From Development to Dialogue. Oxford: Clarendon Press, 1996, pp. 249–278
 Esteva, Gustavo: "Beyond Development, What?", with M.S. Prakash, in: Development in Practice, Vol. 8, No.3, August 1998.
 Esteva, Gustavo: "The Zapatistas and People's Power", in Capital & Class, 68, Summer 1999.
 Esteva, Gustavo: "The meaning and scope of the struggle for autonomy" in: Lat. Am. Perspect., 28:2, March 2001, pp. 120–148
 Esteva, Gustavo(2004a): "Back from the future" -Notes for the presentation in “Schooling and Education: A Symposium with Friends of Ivan Illich” organized by TALC New Vision, Milwaukee, October 9, 2004. online
 Esteva, Gustavo(2004b):“Rupturas:” Turning Points online
Esteva, Gustavo: The Oaxaca commune and Mexico's autonomous movement's, Oaxaca de Juárez, Oaxaca, México : Ed. ¡Basta!, 2008, 22 p.

See also
Development criticism

Notes

Secondary literature
Terán, Gustavo: Conversations with Mexican nomadic storyteller, Gustavo Esteva : learning from lives on the margins, Dissertation, University of Vermont, 2002. 
 Aram Ziai: "Gustavo Esteva (born 1936). Selbstbestimmte Gemeinwesen statt Entwicklung" in: eins. Entwicklungspolitik. Information Nord Süd, No. 23/24, 2005, 48-50

External links 
  (2001)
 Interview with Gustavo Esteva: The Society of the Different (2006)
 Personal webpage

Living people
People from Mexico City
Mexican activists
Neo-Luddites
1936 births